Parchak or Perchak may refer to:
 Parchak, Khuzestan
 Parchak, Sistan and Baluchestan